The Association of Free Trade Unions of Slovenia (ZSSS) is the largest national trade union center in Slovenia, with a membership of 300,000. It was formed from the remains of the old Yugoslav-era unions.

The ZSSS has control of all four of the trade union seats in the National Council of Slovenia, and is affiliated with the European Trade Union Confederation.

References

External links
ZSSS official site.

Trade unions in Slovenia
European Trade Union Confederation